John Lennon (1940–1980) was an English musician who gained prominence as a member of the Beatles. His songwriting partnership with bandmate Paul McCartney is one of the most celebrated in music history. After their break-up, Lennon recorded over 150 songs as a solo artist. Between 1968 and 1969, Lennon released three avant-garde experimental albums with wife Yoko Ono, as well as a live album and two singles, "Give Peace a Chance" and "Cold Turkey", with the Plastic Ono Band. His debut single before the Beatles' break-up was "Instant Karma!"

Lennon's debut solo album, John Lennon/Plastic Ono Band, was released in late 1970. Influenced by primal scream therapy, its songs are noted for their intense nature and "raw" sound, containing personal lyrics dealing with themes of loss, abandonment, and suffering. Its follow-up, Imagine, was released in 1971. Co-produced by Phil Spector and featuring appearances by former Beatle George Harrison, Imagine features songs with calmer and elaborate arrangements compared to its predecessor, with lyrics discussing peace, love, and notably, an attack on former bandmate Paul McCartney in the song "How Do You Sleep?" Its title track, in particular, is regarded as one of Lennon's finest songs. Also recorded during this time was the Christmas song "Happy Xmas (War Is Over)". Some Time in New York City (1972), a part-studio, part-live album with Yoko Ono and Elephant's Memory, contained songs by both Lennon and Ono, with lyrics discussing political and social issues and topics such as sexism, incarceration, colonialism and racism. Mind Games (1973), Lennon's first self-produced album, marked a return to introspective songwriting, featuring love songs, hard rockers, and bouts of humour. Walls and Bridges (1974), recorded during his 18-month separation from Ono, features rock and pop songs that reflected Lennon's feelings at the time, as well as contributions from Elton John. Rock 'n' Roll (1975), a covers album of late 1950s and early 1960s rock songs, included songs such as "Stand by Me", "Peggy Sue" and "You Can't Catch Me". After Rock 'n' Roll, Lennon took a five-year hiatus from the music industry to raise his son Sean, aside from occasional demos.

Lennon returned to music in 1980 with Ono on the album Double Fantasy. Co-produced by Jack Douglas, the album's songs primarily focus on the couple's relationship, emphasising their love for each other and their son, Sean, with some songs discussing Lennon's hiatus. He was shot and killed by Mark David Chapman three weeks after the album's release. In the years following his death, many previously unissued songs have seen release on other albums, including Milk and Honey (1984), Menlove Ave. (1986), and John Lennon Anthology (1998).

Songs

Notes

References

Bibliography

 
 
 
 
 
 
 

John Lennon

Lennon, John